Claudia Holzner (born 8 February 1994) is a Canadian synchronized swimmer. She represented Canada at the 2020 Summer Olympics held in Tokyo, Japan. She also represented Canada at the World Aquatics Championships in 2013, 2015, 2017 and 2019.

In July 2019, she represented Canada at the 2019 World Aquatics Championships held in Gwangju, South Korea and she competed both in the duet technical routine and duet free routine events. In the same month, she won the gold medal in the women's duet and women's team events at the 2019 Pan American Games held in Lima, Peru.

References

External links 
 

Living people
1994 births
Swimmers from Calgary
Canadian synchronized swimmers
Synchronized swimmers at the 2015 Pan American Games
Artistic swimmers at the 2019 Pan American Games
Pan American Games gold medalists for Canada
Pan American Games medalists in synchronized swimming
Medalists at the 2015 Pan American Games
Medalists at the 2019 Pan American Games
Artistic swimmers at the 2019 World Aquatics Championships
Synchronized swimmers at the 2020 Summer Olympics
Olympic synchronized swimmers of Canada
21st-century Canadian women